Lac de la Ganguise  (also known as Retenue de l'Estrade) is a lake in Aude, France. Its surface area is 2.78 km².

It lies in the communes of Baraigne, Cumiès, Gourvieille, Belflou and Molleville.

Ganguise